Jiaozi Snow Mountain is a mountain located in northern central Yunnan, China.  The mountain peak lies on the border Dongchuan District and Luquan County in Kunming city-level prefecture.  The peak is the highest point in the Eastern Yungui Plateau and the highest point of the Gongwang Mountains.  Jiaozi Snow Mountain is drained on all sides by tributaries of the Yangtze River, whose main stem flows past 20 km to the northwest.

References

Mountains of Yunnan
Geography of Kunming